Merlin Metalworks, Inc. was a pioneer in titanium bicycle design and construction. Merlin introduced the first titanium alloy mountain bike, oversized tubesets, s-bend chain and seat stays for mountain bikes. For road bikes, Merlin commercialized the first titanium butted tubing and many other innovations.

History
Merlin Metalworks was founded in 1986 by Gwyn Jones, Gary Helfrich, and Mike Augspurger in Cambridge, Massachusetts. They were the first to manufacture bicycle frames constructed solely from titanium.  Merlin became known for their meticulous and visually pleasing puddle welds.

The first Merlin frame was a mountain bike frame custom-built for the defending National Mountain Bike Champion Joe Murray. In the following year, the company began a strong relationship with frame designer Tom Kellogg, who helped them produce the world's first 3-2.5 titanium alloy road bicycle frame.  In 1988, Mike Augspurger left Merlin to found One-Off Titanium in Florence, Massachusetts, a company specializing in experimental and custom-designed products for bicycles. In 1989, Ashley Korenblat was hired as CEO.

In 1990, the Subaru-Montgomery team, consisting of Lance Armstrong, Steve Hegg, and Ken Carpenter, began its successful three-year relationship with Merlin.  

In 1991, a year after winning his third Tour de France, Greg LeMond’s Z Team came back to the race on prototypes of the Merlin Extralight. The first titanium bike to fully achieve the metal's promise, it was as strong as steel but lighter, and possessed a unique and pleasing road feel—slightly more forgiving, with a little extra spring and, somewhat counterintuitively, also more stiffness.  

After the company became acquainted with Bob Hall, the first person to enter the Boston Marathon in a wheelchair, they began making titanium-racing chairs for him.

In 1994, Merlin introduced the first titanium cruiser called the Newsboy, which received positive reviews. The bike was re-introduced in 2002 with front-suspension and disc-brakes.

In 1995, Rob Kish won his third Race Across America on a Merlin Extralight.

Acquisition

1998
Saucony acquired Merlin in 1998. In January, 1997 many employees, led by one of Merlin's first employees, Rob Vandermark, left Merlin to form Seven Cycles. Gwyn Jones was the only original founding member that remained with the company. As a result of Saucony's ownership, sales of Merlin frame declined, as stocks were left piling high.

2000
Merlin Metalworks was purchased by the American Bicycle Group in 2000 who relocated the company to Chattanooga, TN.  Until 2011 American Bicycle Group owned three bicycle manufacturers: Merlin, Litespeed, Quintana Roo and the bicycle component maker Real Designs.

2011
On March 16, 2011, American Bicycle Group announced that bicycle retailer Competitive Cyclist of Little Rock, AR had acquired the rights to the Merlin Metalworks brand.

At the spring 2013 National American Handmade Bike (NAHB) show, Competitive Cyclist announced the return of Extralight Merlin road bike production with new geometry and additional models projected for later in the year. The Merlin frame was made by Form Cycles of Arizona.

2018
In the spring of 2018, John Siegrist, announced Janus Cycle Group, had purchased the rights to the Merlin name from Competitive Cyclist and Backcountry.com, and unveiled a new line of Merlin titanium bikes built in Boulder, Colorado at the Sea Otter Classic expo.  Janus also ownes DEAN Titanium.  Started in 1989, Dean only works with titanium bicycle frames.

2021
In the Summer of 2021, Boulder, CO-based Janus Cycle Group, a USA based fabricator of premium titanium bicycles and components, announced that it had sold all company assets to Phil Joseph, a former executive officer of Prologis and Spirit Realty.

https://www.prnewswire.com/news-releases/janus-cycle-group-announces-change-in-ownership-301338997.html

References

External links 
 Merlin Bicycles

Cycle manufacturers of the United States
Vehicle manufacturing companies established in 1986
Mountain bike manufacturers
Companies based in Cambridge, Massachusetts
1986 establishments in Massachusetts